Gore-Browne, a British double-barrelled name, may refer to:
Eric Gore-Browne (1890–1918), English cricketer and British Army officer
Harold Gore Browne (1856–1938), British army officer
Henry Gore-Browne (1830–1912), Irish Victoria Cross recipient
Stewart Gore-Browne (1883–1967), soldier, pioneer settler, and politician and supporter of independence in Northern Rhodesia
Thomas Gore Browne (1807–1887), fourth Governor General of New Zealand
Wilfrid Gore Browne (1859–1928), African Anglican bishop
Henry Gore Browne(2012)
Son Of Bake Off Runner Up Miranda Gore Browne

Others
Gore Browne (died 1843), British army officer

See also
Gore (surname)
Browne (surname)

Compound surnames
English-language surnames
Surnames of English origin